Douglas Daniels (21 August 1924 – 2004) was an English professional footballer who played as a goalkeeper in the Football League.

References

1924 births
2004 deaths
Footballers from Salford
English footballers
Accrington Stanley F.C. (1891) players
Chesterfield F.C. players
New Brighton A.F.C. players
English Football League players
Association football goalkeepers